Hyalarctia sericea is a moth of the family Erebidae first described by William Schaus in 1901. It is found in Brazil, Paraguay and Argentina.

References

Phaegopterina
Moths described in 1901